Kentucky Route 220 (KY 220) is a  state highway in the U.S. state of Kentucky. The highway connects mostly rural areas of Hardin County with Radcliff.

Route description
KY 220 begins at an intersection with KY 333 (Big Spring Road) in the eastern part of Big Spring, within the extreme northwestern corner of Hardin County. This intersection is just east of the Breckinridge–Meade–Hardin county tripoint. It travels to the east and almost immediately curves to a southerly direction. It curves to the southeast, and then passes Martin Cemetery before entering Four Corners. There, it intersects KY 920 (Salt River Road). KY 220 keeps heading to the southeast and curves to the east-northeast. It curves to the east-southeast and intersects KY 1375 (Martin Road). The two highways head to the southeast concurrently and split. KY 220 heads to the east-northeast and begins a concurrency with KY 1600 (Rineyville Road). They travel to the southeast and pass Rineyville Cemetery. They cross Pawley Creek and enter Rineyville. There, they intersect the northern terminus of KY 2212 (Rineyville School Road), cross over some railroad tracks, and split at a roundabout. KY 220 heads to the northeast and intersects KY 361 (Patriot Parkway). On the southwestern edge of Radcliff, it intersects the northern terminus of KY 447 (South Wilson Road). On the southeastern edge of the city, it meets its eastern terminus, an intersection with US 31W (Dixie Highway).

Major intersections

See also

References

0220
Transportation in Hardin County, Kentucky